{{Infobox film
| name           = Chip 'n Dale: Rescue Rangers
| image          = Chip n Dale Rescue Rangers Teaser poster.jpg
| caption        = Official release poster
| alt            = Two chipmunks walk away from an explosion. One is 2D-animated wearing a hat and jacket, the other is CGI-animated wearing a red shirt.
| director       = Akiva Schaffer
| writer         = 
| based_on       = {{plainlist|
 
 {{based on|Chip 'n' Dale|Bill Justice}}
}}
| producer       = 
| starring       = 
| music          = Brian Tyler
| cinematography = Larry Fong
| editing        = Brian Olds
| production_companies = 
| distributor    = Walt Disney StudiosMotion Pictures
| released       = 
| runtime        = 97 minutes
| country        = United States
| language       = English
| budget         = ~$70 million
| gross          = $1,500,000
}}Chip 'n Dale: Rescue Rangers is a 2022 American live-action/animated adventure comedy film based on the characters Chip and Dale and continuation of the animated TV series of the same name, excluding the duo's previous filmography (including their shorts from 1943 to 1959). Directed by Akiva Schaffer and written by Dan Gregor and Doug Mand, the film stars John Mulaney and Andy Samberg as the voices of the titular pair, respectively, with KiKi Layne, Will Arnett, Eric Bana, Flula Borg, Dennis Haysbert, Keegan-Michael Key, Tress MacNeille, Tim Robinson, Seth Rogen and J.K. Simmons. Walt Disney Pictures co-produced the film in association with The Lonely Island (Schaffer and Samberg are two of the members from the company) and alongside producers David Hoberman and Todd Lieberman's Mandeville Films.

The film takes place in a world where fictional characters in cartoons, movies and other media live alongside humans. It centers on Chip and Dale, thirty years since the cancellation of their show due to a falling out, coming back to reconcile their differences while they investigate the kidnapping of their friend and co-star Monterey Jack.Chip 'n Dale: Rescue Rangers premiered in Hollywood on May 16, 2022, and was released in the United States on May 20, 2022, streaming on Disney+ as an original film. It received mostly positive reviews from critics, with praise for its humor, voice acting and meta-commentary. At the 74th Primetime Emmy Awards, the film won for Outstanding Television Movie.

Plot

In a world co-populated by humans and cartoon characters, Chip and Dale meet in elementary school and become best friends. They later relocate to Hollywood and, after casting as extras in commercials and shows, go on to star in the successful television series Chip 'n Dale: Rescue Rangers in the early 1990s. However, when Dale gets his own show, Double-O-Dale, the two have a falling-out that leads to both shows' cancellation.

Thirty years later, Chip is a successful but disillusioned insurance salesman while Dale spends most of his time on the fan convention circuit. The two are contacted by their former Rescue Rangers co-star Monterey Jack, who owes money to the criminal Valley Gang due to his stinky cheese addiction. Monty warns the pair of a trafficking operation where toons are kidnapped, have their appearances altered, and are shipped overseas to produce bootlegs of their works for the rest of their lives. Later that night, the two are informed that Monty has been kidnapped. They meet Police Captain Putty and Officer Ellie Steckler; the latter reveals herself to be a big Rescue Rangers fan, and with the police's hands tied, she suggests Chip and Dale investigate on their own.

Chip and Dale visit Bjornson the Cheesemonger, Monty's cheese dealer, and ask about the Valley Gang. They are taken to the uncanny valley part of town and meet the gang's leader, Sweet Pete—an adult version of Peter Pan—and his henchmen Bob and Jimmy. Realizing they are investigating his bootlegging business, Pete tries to capture the pair, but the chipmunks escape. The two later share their discoveries with Ellie, learning that she is shunned by Putty due to acting on a bad tip and raiding the Nick Jr. studios with negative results. With Ellie's help, the chipmunks sneak into a bathhouse to steal Pete's fitness tracker. They trace his movements to a dock warehouse, though it is already abandoned by the time the police arrive. Inside, they find a large operating machine designed to alter toons' bodies, along with several toon parts, including Monty's mustache.

At the police station, the pair argue over the loss of Monty and their past feud but smell the scent of Monty's cologne. Realizing either Putty or Ellie is working with Sweet Pete, the two flee the station. At the ongoing Fan Con, they try to convince Ugly Sonic to ask his FBI contacts for help, but Pete and his henchmen arrive, having tracked Dale using his social media posts. In the ongoing chase, Bob is restrained and arrested, but Chip is caught by Jimmy and taken to the warehouse. Ellie is also lured there by Putty, revealing he is part of the Valley Gang and has been covering for Pete, including giving Ellie the false Nick Jr. tip.

Sweet Pete has Ellie call Dale to lure him to the warehouse, but Ellie sends a coded message using a Rescue Rangers episode. Dale realizes Ellie is in trouble and contacts former Rescue Rangers co-stars Gadget Hackwrench and Zipper, now married with children, for help. Dale enters the warehouse using a firework, which gets lodged into the machine and stops it before it can be used on Chip. The machine goes haywire, transforming Jimmy into a fairy and Pete into a giant amalgamation of various toons. While Ellie fights and defeats Putty, Pete chases Chip and Dale through the warehouse, revealing it to also be where the bootlegs are filmed. The chipmunks lure Pete to the docks and use a ploy from a Rescue Rangers episode to trap him.

The FBI, led by Ugly Sonic, arrive to arrest the Valley Gang. Sweet Pete fires a cannonball at Chip, but Dale takes the hit. Chip fears Dale is dead and apologizes for his behavior over the years, but Dale reveals he was protected by a golden pog Chip gave him. The chipmunks free all the bootlegged toons, including Monty, and Dale introduces the Rescue Rangers to Ellie, who decides to open her own detective agency. As the team departs, Dale convinces them to film a Rescue Rangers reboot, which is later released to great success, much to Darkwing Duck’s dismay.

Cast

 John Mulaney as Chip, a chipmunk and the once heroic, intelligent, unflappable leader and co-founder of the Rescue Rangers who upheld a strong moral standard and now works as a risk-averse and bitter insurance salesman. Tress MacNeille briefly provides the voice acting for Chip's chipmunk voice (credited as "high-pitch Chip"), reprising her role from the original series. Mason Blomberg voices Chip as a child during the film's prologue.
 Andy Samberg as Dale, a chipmunk and Chip's fun-loving former best friend and co-founder of the Rescue Rangers, who possesses an impulsive mindset and now makes a living with fan convention appearances. Dale's present-day appearance is depicted with photorealistic computer-animation, unlike the cel-shaded animation of his former teammates; this was explained in-universe as "getting CGI surgery," an equivalent to a plastic surgery. Corey Burton briefly provides the voice acting for Dale's chipmunk voice (credited as "high-pitch Dale"), reprising his role from the original series. Juliet Donenfeld voices Dale as a child during the film's prologue.
 KiKi Layne as Ellie Steckler, a rookie LAPD officer and lifelong fangirl of the Rescue Rangers.
 Will Arnett as Sweet Pete, the toon actor who played Peter Pan, being now a middle aged man, with a Bobby Cannavale-esque voice, who founded the Valley Gang after being fired due to his age. Archival recordings of Betty Lou Gerson as Cruella de Vil were used for the chimeric Sweet Pete's laughter.
 Eric Bana as Monterey Jack, a cheese-loving Australian mouse and a member of the Rescue Rangers. The character was originally voiced by Peter Cullen and Jim Cummings in the original series.
 Flula Borg as DJ Herzogenaurach, a snake DJ who is a fan of Chip and Dale.
 Dennis Haysbert as Zipper, a housefly and member of the Rescue Rangers. He and Gadget eventually got married and had children after the show's cancellation while also speaking English. Corey Burton also provides Zipper's unintelligible buzzing sounds from the original series.
 Keegan-Michael Key as Bjornson the Cheesemonger, a Swedish Chef-esque cheesemonger and member of the Valley Gang. Key also voices a frog co-worker of Chip.
 Tress MacNeille as Gadget Hackwrench, an inventive mouse and member of the Rescue Rangers. She and Zipper eventually got married and had kids after the show's cancellation. MacNeille reprises her role from the original series.
 Tim Robinson as Ugly Sonic, a version of Sonic the Hedgehog who appears in his scrapped original design from the 2020 feature film adaptation.
 Seth Rogen as Bob, a motion capture Viking dwarf member of the Valley Gang. Bob is loosely based on the motion capture characters of various motion-capture films such as The Polar Express and Beowulf. Rogen also reprises his voice roles of Pumbaa from the 2019 version of The Lion King, Master Mantis from the Kung Fu Panda franchise, and B.O.B. from the Monsters vs. Aliens franchise.
 J. K. Simmons as Captain S. Putty, a Gumby-esque claymation police captain who is investigating the missing toon cases, but is later revealed to be part of the Valley Gang.

Additionally, Da'Vone McDonald voices Jimmy, a CGI polar bear member of the Valley Gang. Director Akiva Schaffer alluded Jimmy's appearance to the Coca-Cola polar bear. Schaffer provides voices for numerous minor roles including E.T. and Mr. Natural while also appearing in live-action as the director of the original show. Rachel Bloom voices Flounder from the 1989 version of The Little Mermaid, Cubby of the Lost Boys from Peter Pan (1953), Chip's mom, a bootleg Bart Simpson, and a cartoon cow who strongly resembles Clarabelle Cow, among other characters. Liz Cackowski voices Tigra, who is modeled after her appearance in The Avengers: United They Stand, and Officer O'Hara. Despite not voicing Monterey Jack in the film, Jim Cummings reprises his roles as Fat Cat from the original series, the Shredder's "right arm" from the 1987 Teenage Mutant Ninja Turtles animated series, Pete, and Darkwing Duck, in addition to voicing bootleg versions of Winnie the Pooh and Tigger. Chris Parnell appears as Dave Bollinari, Dale's agent. Jeff Bennett voices Lumière from the 1991 version of Beauty and the Beast. Steven Curtis Chapman voices Baloo from the 2016 version of The Jungle Book. Jorma Taccone voices the DC Extended Universe version of Bruce Wayne / Batman along with other minor roles. Alan Oppenheimer voices both He-Man and Skeletor (reprising his role as the latter) from the original He-Man and the Masters of the Universe. Charles Fleischer reprises his role as Roger Rabbit from Who Framed Roger Rabbit. Original Rescue Rangers co-creator Tad Stones cameos as the voice of a studio executive. David Tennant reprises his role as Scrooge McDuck from the 2017 version of DuckTales. Paula Abdul appears as a de-aged version of herself, alongside MC Skat Kat from her video for "Opposites Attract", and also voices the 3-D reporter modeled after her. Paul Rudd appears in a live-action cameo as himself.

In the spirit of Who Framed Roger Rabbit, the film features numerous appearances of other animated characters from within the Disney catalogue and other third party properties that appear without dialogue:
 Among the Disney characters include the Three Little Pigs, the Magic Carpet from Aladdin (1992), the Colonel from One Hundred and One Dalmatians (1961), Linda Flynn-Fletcher from Phineas and Ferb, The Little House, Doc McStuffins, Wynnchel and Duncan from Wreck-It Ralph, and Professor Norton Nimnul, Wart, and Mepps from the original series.
 Non-Disney characters include two of the Jellicle cats from the 2019 film adaptation of Andrew Lloyd Webber's musical Cats, Blaster from The Transformers, several characters from My Little Pony: Friendship Is Magic, Randy Marsh from South Park, McGruff the Crime Dog, and Detective Florez from Big Mouth.

Production
Development and pre-production

On January 31, 2014, it was announced that The Walt Disney Company was developing a live-action movie based on the Disney Afternoon animated series Chip 'n Dale: Rescue Rangers with CGI special effects, similar to 20th Century Fox' Alvin & the Chipmunks film series. David Hoberman and Todd Lieberman signed on as its producers, while Robert Rugan was hired to write and direct the film. It would have followed an origin story for the Rescue Rangers.

In May 2019, Akiva Schaffer, known for the 2007 cult classic Hot Rod, became the film's new director, replacing Rugan, while Dan Gregor and Doug Mand became its new writers and claimed that the film would follow a "meta, something self-referential and cool" take on the characters. David Hoberman and Todd Lieberman returned as its producers, and the project became a co-production between Walt Disney Pictures and Mandeville Films. Gregor and Mand had started the new script as a spiritual successor to Who Framed Roger Rabbit, taking into account the changes in animation techniques in the four decades since Roger Rabbit had been made. They wanted to keep what they felt made Roger Rabbit successful, being that the film "is not talking down to the animated characters [and] playing it real and to the top of your intelligence." Schaffer said they were further influenced by buddy cop films of the 1990s such as the Lethal Weapon series, while including more comedic elements.

Schaffer agreed to direct the film after he was sent Gregor and Mand's script; he agreed due to the film's self-referential humor, his love for both the original series and Roger Rabbit, and an interest in working on animated films. The film features cameos from several non-Disney animated properties due to Schaffer wanting the film to be "a love letter celebration of animation", similar to Roger Rabbit, and felt including only Disney characters would instead make the film "just a celebration of Disney animation". Schaffer did not want to go overboard on such cameos, going by the rule "Don’t put in a cameo unless it’s forwarding the story or putting a button on a really good laugh". Schaffer used the example of the donut cops from Wreck-It Ralph, who not only served as recognizable characters for younger audiences, but also played on the popular concept of police officers loving to eat donuts as a joke for those that had not seen the film. Non-Disney companies authorized through Disney's legal team for their characters to appear in the film after Schaffer assured them it was "not going to make fun of their characters".

Schaffer said that for the film's villain, they wanted to play on the idea of child actors that were not able to continue acting as adults through cartoon characters. Early on, the team considered using an adult version of Charlie Brown from Peanuts for the role, but eventually selected Peter Pan for easier licensing. This was compared to Bobby Driscoll, the original voice actor for Peter Pan in the 1953 film. In the years following its release, Driscoll's acting career spiraled into decline after being terminated from Disney as he reached puberty. This affected his personal life, with Driscoll becoming addicted to drugs. In early 1968, Driscoll passed away as a result of heart failure from drug abuse. Several events from this point in Driscoll's life were applied similarly to Sweet Pete's backstory. The film was heavily criticized for this, with both critics and audiences pointing out how the portrayal of Sweet Pete, with the context of Driscoll's later life in mind, came off as disrespectful and insensitive. Despite this, Schaffer had stated there was no intention to mock any specific actor in the film.

According to storyboard artist Simeon Wilkins, they had planned for Jar-Jar Binks to feature in the convention hall scenes, but he was replaced with Ugly Sonic. Other discarded appearances included actor Chris Evans, Elliot from Pete's Dragon, Sulley and Mike from Monsters, Inc., Tick-Tock the Crocodile from Peter Pan, Sabretooth from X-Men: The Animated Series, and Mushu from Mulan.

Casting
Though initial reports said that Corey Burton would return as the voice of Dale, it was announced in December 2020 that Andy Samberg would provide the voice for the character. John Mulaney as Chip was revealed in the same announcement and Seth Rogen was announced to be making a cameo in the film. Additional casting was announced with the release of the teaser trailer on February 15, 2022. In April 2022, during the release of a new trailer, it was confirmed that Burton would indeed reprise Dale along with Tress MacNeille reprising Chip for brief dialogue.

Filming
Principal photography commenced on March 16, 2021, in Los Angeles with Larry Fong as cinematographer. Filming lasted 30–35 days.

Visual effects and animation
Both visual effects for the film and the Rescue Rangers' and Sweet Pete's animation were provided by Moving Picture Company (MPC). While there are numerous hand-drawn animated characters shown as minor roles, the crew decided for MPC to provide computer-animation for the Rescue Rangers and Sweet Pete, while giving them a cel-shaded look to appear hand-drawn, for time and budget. MPC had also done the animation work for the Sonic the Hedgehog film, and were able to provide the model for Ugly Sonic once it was cleared for use. For Roger Rabbit's cameo at the start of the film, one of the animators from Who Framed Roger Rabbit was brought to animate the character. Animation services were also provided by Passion Pictures. The ponies from My Little Pony: Friendship is Magic were done by Top Draw Animation, who animated them for the series and 2017 film. Schaffer said the animation budget was "an eighth of what like a Pixar or Disney Animation movie would be" and that it accounted for half the film's total cost.

Music
Brian Tyler is the film's composer and conductor and its theme song was written by pop songwriter Mark Mueller, who composed it for the television series. Post Malone recorded a cover of the television show's theme song for the film. The soundtrack album was released on May 20, 2022, alongside the film's release. The song used in the teaser trailer and the main trailer is "Best Friend" by Saweetie featuring Doja Cat. The songs "Friendship" by Tenacious D and "Laid to Rest" by Lamb of God can be heard in the movie, but is not included in the soundtrack.

Soundtrack

ReleaseChip 'n Dale: Rescue Rangers premiered at the El Capitan Theatre in Hollywood, California, and was released as a Disney+ original film on May 20, 2022.

Reception

Audience viewership
According to Whip Media, Chip 'n' Dale: Rescue Rangers was the most watched movie across all platforms in the United States, during the week of May 20, 2022 and the most watched movie across all platforms in the United States, during the week of May 27, 2022. According to Nielsen Holdings, Chip 'n' Dale: Rescue Rangers was the 5th most watched program and the 2nd most watched movie across all platforms, during the week of May 16, 2022 to May 22, 2022. According to Reelgood, Chip 'n' Dale: Rescue Rangers was the 10th most watched program across all platforms, during the week of May 26, 2022 to June 1, 2022.

Critical reception
On the review aggregator website Rotten Tomatoes, 80% of 135 critics' reviews are positive with an average rating of 6.9/10. The website's consensus reads, "Sometimes some reboots fall through the cracks, but Chip 'n' Dale: Rescue Rangers picks up the slack with a fast, funny film that (almost) never fails." Metacritic, which uses a weighted average, assigned the film a score of 66 out of 100 based on 25 critics, indicating "generally favorable reviews".

Frank Scheck of The Hollywood Reporter gave it a positive review, saying it succeeded where Space Jam: A New Legacy failed, and called it "the funniest movie of the year so far, either animated or live-action. Or in this case both, since it ingeniously melds the two forms in the cleverest manner since Who Framed Roger Rabbit." Amy Nicholson of Variety wrote: "This frenetic and funny crossbreeding of live action and cartoon is both a reboot and an anti-reboot, a corporate-funded raspberry at corporate IP, and a giddily dumb smart aleck committed to mocking its joke — and making it, too." David Sims of The Atlantic reviewed the movie positively, describing it as a contemporary version of Who Framed Roger Rabbit, and wrote: "The movie works mostly because, through its weird tricks of animation and self-referentiality, it somehow finds a fresh satirical angle. Other films have skewered an industry that’s intent on bludgeoning audiences with their own fading memories, but only Chip ’n Dale actually gives those memories a new life." Calum Marsh of The New York Times reviewed the film positively, drawing some comparisons to Who Framed Roger Rabbit, writing, "A wry take on the material that combines animation and live-action comedy, the movie has some of the hip flair and anarchic meta-humor of Who Framed Roger Rabbit, as well as an irreverent, self-referential attitude that’s rather appealing." Matt Fowler of IGN scored the movie a 7 out of 10, finding the story "a bit thin", but praising the humor and its handling of pop culture references, while calling Samberg and Mulaney "just the right voice duo to bring these chipmunks back to life."

Nick Allen of RogerEbert.com gave the film a more mixed review, rating it 2.5 out of 4 stars, praising the different styles of animation, complimenting the performances of the voice actors, and stated that the film manages to provide comical moments. He criticized the plot, writing, "At the least the premise is funny [...] but it’s still stuck in that usual animated movie spot of trying to make something "for kids," with some irreverent references and deep cuts for the adults. Take away the cameos—in the recording booth, and animated on-screen—and you get something that's a little too close to the same old junk." Benjamin Lee of The Guardian rated the film 3 out of 5 stars, stating, "The script feels a few punch-ups away from being quite as funny as it could have been. But what Gregor and Mand do manage is a neat balance of tone, the knowing satire never falling into self-referential smugness thanks to a healthy dose of both earnestness and a genuine affection for the source material." Jennifer Green of Common Sense Media rated the movie 3 out of 5 stars, praised the depiction of positive messages, citing friendship and forgiveness, found agreeable the presence of role models across the different characters who fight for justice, while complimenting the diversity of the cast.

Tad Stones, the co-creator of Rescue Rangers, has expressed his approval of the film, calling it "fantastic."

Accolades

Future
After the film's release, writers Dan Gregor and Doug Mand said they were interested in working on a sequel but it would depend on the popularity of the first film.

Notes

See alsoWho Framed Roger RabbitCool WorldThe Happytime Murders''
Postmodernist film
Disney Renaissance
Peak TV

References

External links

 
 
 

2022 films
2022 action adventure films
2022 action comedy films
2022 animated films
2022 computer-animated films
2020s English-language films
American computer-animated films
American crime comedy films
American crossover films
American films with live action and animation
American parody films
American police detective films
American satirical films
Animated crime films
Animated crossover films
Animated films based on animated television series
Animated films set in Los Angeles
Animation fandom
Chip 'n' Dale films
Chip 'n Dale Rescue Rangers
Comedy crossover films
Clay animation films
Disney fandom
Disney parodies
Disney+ original films
Fictional portrayals of the Los Angeles Police Department
Films about actors
Films about animation
Films about fandom
Films about kidnapping in the United States
Films about rodents
Films directed by Akiva Schaffer
Films impacted by the COVID-19 pandemic
Films produced by David Hoberman
Films produced by Todd Lieberman
Films scored by Brian Tyler
Films set in 1982
Films set in 1990
Films set in the 1980s
Films set in the 1990s
Films shot in Los Angeles
Flying Bark Productions films
Foghorn Leghorn films
Henery Hawk films
Live-action films based on animated series
Looney Tunes films
Mandeville Films films
Metafictional works
Peter Pan films
Postmodern films
Primetime Emmy Award for Outstanding Made for Television Movie winners
Puppet films
Reboot films
Self-reflexive films
Sonic the Hedgehog films
Walt Disney Pictures films
Who Framed Roger Rabbit
sv:Chip 'n Dale: Rescue Rangers (film)